Transfer RNA-Glu (CTC) 1-5 is a protein that in humans is encoded by the TRE-CTC1-5 gene.

References